Polite Society is a 2023 British action comedy film written and directed by Nida Manzoor (in her feature film directorial debut) and starring Priya Kansara and Ritu Arya.

The film had its world premiere at the 2023 Sundance Film Festival on 21 January 2023, will be released on 7 April 2023, in the United Kingdom.

Synopsis
Ria Khan practises martial arts in order to become a stunt woman but when her sister drops out of art school and gets engaged, Ria decides she and her friends must pull off a wedding-heist.

Cast
Priya Kansara as Ria 
Ritu Arya as Lena 
Nimra Bucha as Raheela
Akshaye Khanna as Salim 
Jeff Mirza as Rafe, Ria and Lena's father
Ella Bruccoleri as Alba 
Seraphina Beh as Clara 
Shona Babayemi as Kovacs 
Shobu Kapoor as Ria and Lena's mother

Production
In January 2022 it was revealed a feminist action comedy focusing on two British-Pakistani sisters was being filmed in London by Nida Manzoor with Working Title, Focus Features and Parkville Pictures, with a tone and voice similar to Manzoor’s breakthrough and BAFTA, Peabody, and Rose d'Or award winning sitcom series We Are Lady Parts. In February 2022 it was announced that filming had wrapped on the project in London. it is produced by Tim Bevan and Eric Fellner for Working Title with Olivier Kaempfer and John Pocock for Parkville Pictures. Focus Features had distribution rights.

Release
Polite Society was released at the 2023 Sundance Film Festival on 21 January 2023. The film will premiere at the 2023 Glasgow Film Festival on 12 March 2023, and is scheduled to be released in the United Kingdom on 7 April 2023. It is scheduled to be released in the United States on 28 April 2023.

Reception 
On the review aggregator Rotten Tomatoes, the film has a 93% approval rating from critics based on 43 reviews, with an average rating of 7.4/10.

Robbie Collin in the Daily Telegraph described it as “rollicking” and “crafty and fresh” and “all done with infectious pep”, with “the fights themselves – witty, lucid, crunchy, slick” and Kansara a “blatant star-in-the-making”.

References

External links
 

2023 films
2023 action comedy films
British action comedy films
2020s English-language films
2023 directorial debut films
2020s British films
Focus Features films
Working Title Films films